Julien Laurent (born March 17, 1993) is a Canadian football defensive lineman who is currently a free agent. He was most recently a member of the Ottawa Redblacks of the Canadian Football League (CFL). Laurent played college football at Georgia State. He was selected by the BC Lions with the seventh overall pick in the 2018 CFL Draft.

College career
Laurent was a two year starter and three year letter-winner for the Panthers as a defensive lineman. During his senior campaign he helped a defense set school records for fewest points per game allowed (24.75), fewest rushing yards per game (136.4), fewest yards per rushing attempt (4.13) and most sacks (24). He was a part of the Georgia State program's first-ever bowl game win in the 2017 Cure Bowl.

Professional career

BC Lions
On May 3, 2018, Laurent was selected with the seventh overall pick in the 2018 CFL Draft by the BC Lions, after trading with the Winnipeg Bombers. Laurent appeared in seven games during his rookie season, recording two tackles before being released in 2019.

Ottawa Redblacks
On August 20, 2019, Laurent was signed to the practice squad for the Ottawa Redblacks of the CFL. Laurent spent most of the season on Ottawa's practice roster before being activated in the final regular season game. He was waived by the Redblacks February 25, 2020.

References

External links
Ottawa Redblacks bio
Georgia State Panthers bio

1993 births
Living people
Players of Canadian football from Ontario
Canadian football people from Toronto
Georgia State Panthers football players
BC Lions players
Ottawa Redblacks players